Civray is a commune in the Vienne department and Nouvelle-Aquitaine region of western France.

Population

See also
Communes of the Vienne department

References

Communes of Vienne
Poitou